Ecobank Kenya is a commercial bank in Kenya. It is one of the commercial banks licensed by the Central Bank of Kenya, the central bank and national banking regulator.

Overview
On 16 June 2008, Ecobank Transnational Incorporated acquired 75% of EABS Bank, which had been licensed in 2005. The bank changed its name to Ecobank Kenya Limited to reflect the new shareholding. Later, it increased its shareholding in the bank, to 95.67% as at 3 July 2013. , Ecobank Kenya had total assets valued at approximately KES:36.9 billion (US$427.6 million), with shareholders' equity of about KES:3.39 billion (US$39.3 million).

Ecobank network

Ecobank Kenya is a member of Ecobank Transnational, the leading independent pan-African bank, headquartered in Lomé, Togo with affiliates in West Africa, Central Africa, East Africa and Southern Africa. Ecobank, which was established in 1985, has grown to a network of over 600 branches, employing over 10,000 people, with offices in 33 countries including Benin, Burkina Faso, Burundi]], Cameroon, Cape Verde, Central African Republic, Chad, Republic of Congo, Democratic Republic of Congo, Equatorial Guinea, France, Gabon, Ghana, Guinea, Guinea-Bissau, Ivory Coast, Kenya, Liberia, Malawi, Mali, Niger, Nigeria, Rwanda, Sao Tome, Senegal, Sierra Leone, South Sudan, Tanzania, The Gambia, Togo, Uganda, Zambia and Zimbabwe. Ecobank Transnational also maintains representative offices in Angola, China, Ethiopia, South Africa, and the United Arab Emirates.

Parent company
Ecobank Transnational Inc. is the parent company of the Ecobank Group which includes the following specialized subsidiaries:

 Ecobank Development Corporation (EDC) – Lomé, Togo
 EDC Investment Corporation – Abidjan, Ivory Coast
 EDC Investment Corporation – Douala, Cameroon
 EDC Securities Limited – Lagos, Nigeria
 EDC Stockbrokers Limited – Accra, Ghana
 Ecobank Asset Management – Abidjan, Ivory Coast
 e-Process International SA – Lomé, Togo
 ECV Servicios – Praia, Cape Verde

The stock of Ecobank is traded on the Ghana Stock Exchange (GSE), the Nigerian Stock Exchange (NSE) and the BRVM stock exchange in Abidjan, Ivory Coast.

Ownership
Ecobank Kenya is 100% owned by Ecobank Transnational.

Governance
The chairman of the 10-person board of directors is Charles Ogalo, a businessman and non-executive director. Samuel Ashitey Adjei, serves as the managing director and CEO.

Branch Network
, the bank maintains 21 networked branches in Kenya. In October 2016, Ecobank Kenya notified the public and its customers of its plans to close nine of its twenty-nine branches, to reduce the number to 20, by end of April 2017.

See also

References

External links
  Ecobank Website
  Ecobank Group Gets Nod To Open Investment Bank In Kenya
  Central Bank Admits Error In Listing Ecobank As Small Lender

Banks of Kenya
Banks established in 2005
Companies based in Nairobi
2005 establishments in Kenya